Galina Dimitrova Courson (born 11 April 1978) is a former professional tennis player from Bulgaria.

Biography
Dimitrova spent her professional career on the ITF circuit, reaching a top singles ranking of 400 in the world. As a doubles player she had a best ranking of 316 and won three ITF titles. She represented the Bulgaria Fed Cup team in ties against Russia and Greece in 1997.

From 1998 to 2000, Dimitrova played college tennis for the University of North Georgia. A two-time Southern States Athletic Conference champion, she was both NAIA National Player of the Year and an All-American in 1999. Dimitrova, who was named All-American again in 2000, is a member of the UNG Athletics Hall of Fame.

She is now known as Galina Courson and is working as a financial advisor in Atlanta.

ITF Circuit finals

Doubles: 7 (3 titles, 4 runner–ups)

References

External links
 
 
 

1978 births
Living people
Bulgarian female tennis players
University of North Georgia alumni
Bulgarian emigrants to the United States